Andrés Javier Martínez  (born 16 October 1972) is a former Uruguayan footballer who played as a midfielder.

International career
Martínez made eight appearances for the senior Uruguay national football team from 1992 to 2001. He made his debut in a friendly match against Poland (0–1 loss) on November 29, 1992, in the Estadio Centenario in Montevideo under coach Luis Alberto Cubilla.

References

External links
 

1972 births
Living people
People from Pando, Uruguay
Uruguayan footballers
Uruguayan expatriate footballers
Uruguay international footballers
2001 Copa América players
Peñarol players
C.A. Cerro players
Defensor Sporting players
C.A. Bella Vista players
Racing Club de Montevideo players
C.A. Progreso players
CA Osasuna players
U.S. Lecce players
Bologna F.C. 1909 players
Serie A players
Expatriate footballers in Italy
Expatriate footballers in Spain
Association football midfielders